Timothy or Tim Foster may refer to:

Tim Foster (soccer) (born 1969), American soccer player
Tim Foster (born 1970), English rower
Timothy Foster (settler) (1720–1783), first colonial settler of Winthrop, Maine